Doron Medalie (born 5 December 1977) is an Israeli songwriter, composer and artistic director. He co-wrote the song "Toy", which was performed by Netta Barzilai and won the Eurovision Song Contest 2018.

Biography
Doron Medalie was raised in Ramat Hasharon. As a child he studied music and keyboards at the  music school, theatre at the Habima national theatre and Alon performing- art high-school. Later on, he studied screen-acting at the Sharon Alexander studio, Flamenco dancing at the Compass dance company, and Gaga lessons at the Batsheva Dance Company with Ohad Naharin.

Music career
Medalie has written over 500 songs, mostly known for his Middle Eastern pop style, like the famous "Tel Aviv Ya Habibi Tel Aviv" - the official anthem of Tel Aviv Gay Pride 2013.

Medalie is also known as the one who is in charge of a big "Revolution Of Joy" in the Israeli music style, during the 2010s.

He worked with top Israeli singers including Eyal Golan, Shlomi Shabat, Omer Adam, Lior Narkis, Moshe Perez, Noa Kirel, Netta Barzilai and Harel Skaat. His solo album, Abyss, was released in 2008.

Medalie created over 30 songs to the famous Israel's children show "the festigal".

In 2019 he co-wrote with Idan Raichel, the official song for the 70th anniversary of Israel- "shevet achim ve’achayot"

Medalie also composed theme songs and soundtracks for many Israeli TV shows, likeGoalstar, The Unit, Bolywood. Royal Chef, The Bachelor, Split. Zagury Empire, "ZIGI" and for Disney Israel, Summer Break Stories, North Star and Shavit Ventura Show.

Few songs of Medalie was translated to Greek, sung by the Greek superstar Eleni Foureira, and became big hits in Greece and Cyprus.

Among his achievements are 3 ACUM awards (the Israeli songwriters association), 2 songs of the year, 2 songs of the decade, 4 most played songs on the public dance floor chart.

Artistic director career
Medalie is the only songwriter in the world (who is not a performing artist) who got the spot as a coach on The Voice Israel, 2019.

As an artistic director, he started his career in 2001, as an assistant director of Yaron Meiri's Orpan Group. Together they were in charge of more than 100 commercial-stage-shows. His breakthrough was as artistic manager of the talent shows A Star is Born and Eyal Golan Is Calling You.

Later on he was in charge of the casting of X FACTOR Israel (2021).

For more than 15 years, he directed the Israeli Music Awards (ACUM) and the national Memorial Day ceremony.

Views and opinions 
He said that the lyrics of the 2018 Eurovision-winning song "Toy" were inspired by the #MeToo movement, and that the song carries a message about "the awakening of female power and social justice".

Eurovision Song Contest
Medalie participated at the Eurovision song contest 8 times, as an artistic member of the Israeli delegation.

He directed the Israeli entry for the Eurovision three times (Boaz Ma'uda - 2008, Harel Skaat - 2010, Moran Mazor - 2013).

He wrote and composed the Israeli entries for Eurovision 2015  - "Golden Boy" (Nadav Guedj),
which ended 3rd in the semi-finals and was awarded a spot in the final on May 23, 2015, where he ended 9th with 97 points.
The song achieved "the Israeli song of the year" award.

For Eurovision 2016 - "Made of Stars" (Hovi Star), which ended 7th in the semi-finals and was awarded a spot in the final on May 14, 2016, where he ended 14th with 135 points.

Doron collaborated with Zvika Pick; together they wrote "Sing My Song" for Sofia Nizharadze (Eurovision pre-selection Georgia, 2010).

For the Eurovision Song Contest 2018, he composed the music and wrote the lyrics together with composer Stav Beger for the winning song "Toy", sung by Netta Barzilai.

In 2020, he co-wrote with Idan Raichel the song "Feker Libi", which was sung by Eden Alene and would have represented Israel in the Eurovision Song Contest 2020, before the event was cancelled due to the COVID-19 pandemic.

In 2023, he co-wrote the song "Unicorn", sung by Noa Kirel 
(music & lyrics by: May Sfadia, Yinon Yahel, Noa Kirel and Doron Medalie).

Notable songs
Shlomi Shabat – "Aba", "Bereshit Olam"
Eyal Golan – "Im yesh gan eden"
Omer Adam – "Tel Aviv", "Why li", "Baniti allayich", "Names mimech", "temperatura" and many more
Lior Narkis – "Shaga'at-Tarefet", "Mahapecha shel simcha", "Amalia"
Harel Skaat – "21st century", "La’uf"
Maya Buskila – "Nishmati"
Nadav Guedj – "Golden Boy"
Hovi Star – "Made of Stars"
Eleni Foureira – "Sto Theo me paei" (Cover of Golden Boy), "Ti koitas", "Caramela", "Temperatura"
Netta Barzilai – "Toy"
Moshe Perez - "Caramela"
Artists of Israel – "Shevet Achim Ve’achayot"
Indira Levak – "You Will Never Break My Heart"
Milica Pavlović – "Riba de luxe"

See also
Music of Israel
Television in Israel

References

1977 births
Living people
20th-century Israeli Jews
21st-century Israeli Jews
Jewish Israeli musicians
Israeli male songwriters
Israeli artistic directors
Israeli gay musicians
Gay composers
Gay Jews
Israeli LGBT songwriters
Gay songwriters
20th-century Israeli male musicians
21st-century Israeli male musicians
People from Ramat HaSharon
Eurovision Song Contest winners
20th-century Israeli LGBT people
21st-century Israeli LGBT people